Tyrone Edward Kane (born 8 July 1994) is an Irish cricketer who plays for the Ireland national cricket team. He was one of the eleven cricketers to play in Ireland's first ever Test match, against Pakistan, in May 2018. In December 2018, he was one of nineteen players to be awarded a central contract by Cricket Ireland for the 2019 season. In January 2020, he was one of nineteen players to be awarded a central contract from Cricket Ireland, the first year in which all contracts were awarded on a full-time basis.

Domestic and T20 career
He made his List A debut for Leinster Lightning in the 2017 Inter-Provincial Cup on 1 May 2017. He made his first-class debut for Leinster Lightning in the 2017 Inter-Provincial Championship on 30 August 2017.

In July 2019, he was selected to play for the Dublin Chiefs in the inaugural edition of the Euro T20 Slam cricket tournament. However, the following month the tournament was cancelled.

International career
He made his Twenty20 International (T20I) debut against Scotland on 18 June 2015. In June 2016, he was named in Ireland's One Day International (ODI) squad for their series against Afghanistan, that took place the following month, but he did not play.

In May 2018, he was named in a fourteen-man squad for Ireland's first ever Test match, which was played against Pakistan later the same month. He made his Test debut for Ireland, against Pakistan, on 11 May 2018 and was dismissed for a duck.

In May 2019, he was named in Ireland's ODI squad for their series against Afghanistan, but he did not play. The following month, he was named in the Ireland Wolves squad for their home series against the Scotland A cricket team. On 10 July 2020, Kane was named in Ireland's 21-man squad to travel to England to start training behind closed doors for the ODI series against the England cricket team.

References

External links
 

1994 births
Living people
Irish cricketers
Ireland Test cricketers
Ireland Twenty20 International cricketers
Cricketers from County Dublin
Leinster Lightning cricketers
Munster Reds cricketers